William Bates Francis (October 25, 1860 – December 5, 1954) was a U.S. Representative from Ohio for two terms from 1911 to 1915.

Early life and career 
Born near Updegraff, Ohio, Francis attended the public schools.
He studied law, and was admitted to the bar in 1889 and commenced practice in Martins Ferry, Ohio.
City solicitor in 1897, 1898, and 1900.
He served as member of the board of school examiners of Martins Ferry 1903–1908.
He served as delegate to the Democratic National Convention in 1904.
He served as member of the board of education of Martins Ferry 1908–1914.

Congress 
Francis was elected as a Democrat to the Sixty-second and Sixty-third Congresses (March 4, 1911 – March 4, 1915).
He was an unsuccessful candidate for reelection in 1914 to the Sixty-fourth Congress.

Later career 
He resumed the practice of his profession.
He served as chairman of the Ohio State Civil Service 1931-1935.
Supervisor of properties for aid to aged, until his retirement.
Resided in Martins Ferry and later in St. Clairsville, Ohio, until his death.

Death
He died in Wheeling, West Virginia, December 5, 1954 and was interred in Mount Pleasant Cemetery, Mount Pleasant, Ohio.

Sources

1860 births
1954 deaths
People from Martins Ferry, Ohio
People from St. Clairsville, Ohio
Democratic Party members of the United States House of Representatives from Ohio
Ohio lawyers